Tribold was a company that operated in the Operational support systems market, producing Enterprise Product Management (EPM) software specifically for telecommunications service providers. Tribold EPM was a single, integrated suite of Enterprise Product Management applications.

Tribold EPM was based on a Centralized Product & Service Catalog (CPC) and a Product lifecycle management (PLM) solution.

Tribold was headquartered in London, United Kingdom, with offices in North America and Asia. Tribold was founded in 2003 as a privately held company. It was purchased by Sigma Systems in 2013.

History
Tribold Limited was established in October 2003 by former Accenture Communications executives. It was founded as a commercial software company to make and sell Product Catalog/Product Lifecycle software to Communication Service Providers.

In 2004, Tribold launched the first generally available version of software, Tribold Product Portfolio Manager (‘PPM’). In 2005 the company secured its first institutional investment from Eden Ventures. In 2006, Tribold contracted with its first major Tier 1 customer, Telstra in Australia, and this was closely followed by its first major European Tier 1 customer, Telekom Austria. In 2007 it also secured a USD $15 million institutional funding round from Draper Fisher Jurvetson Esprit and Eden Ventures. In 2009, it entered into another institutional funding round and secured a further US$11million from Draper Fisher Jurvetson Esprit, Eden Ventures and Intel Capital. In 2011, it opened a Research and Development centre in Cwmbran, with financial support from the Welsh government.

References 

Software companies based in London